A Long Time Comin' is the first album by American rock band the Electric Flag, released in 1968. The album has a mix of musical styles, including soul along with blues and rock, with a horn section.

It opens with an updated take on the Howlin' Wolf blues classic "Killing Floor" and includes an adaptation of Sticks McGhee's "Drinkin' Wine, Spo-Dee-O-Dee" titled "Wine".  The album also contains "Groovin’ Is Easy" and "Over-Lovin’ You", which had been released as a single in 1967.

Critical reception

It is widely seen by music critics as an ambitious debut album. The album was somewhat of a failure in the charts, much to the disappointment of Bloomfield, who had worked hard on it. His disappointment was worsened by the success of the Al Kooper directed Super Session, which, featuring Bloomfield, charted much higher than A Long Time Comin'  despite having been recorded over a period of only two days.

It was voted number 4 in the 50 All-Time Long Forgotten Gems from Colin Larkin's All Time Top 1000 Albums.

Track listing
The original LP record has 10 tracks, and a 1988 Columbia Records reissue on CD has four bonus tracks.

Side one
 "Killing Floor" (Chester Burnett a.k.a. Howlin' Wolf) – 4:11
 "Groovin' Is Easy" (Ron Polte) – 3:06
 "Over-Lovin' You" (Mike Bloomfield, Barry Goldberg) – 2:12
 "She Should Have Just" (Ron Polte) – 5:03
 "Wine" (Traditional arr. Bloomfield) – 3:15

Side two
 "Texas" (Bloomfield, Buddy Miles) – 4:49
 "Sittin' in Circles" (Goldberg) – 3:54
 "You Don't Realize" (Bloomfield) – 4:56
 "Another Country" (Polte) – 8:47
 "Easy Rider" (Bloomfield) – 0:53

CD bonus tracks
 "Sunny" (Bobby Hebb) – 4:02
 "Mystery" (Miles) – 2:56
 "Look into My Eyes" (Harvey Brooks, Miles) – 3:07
 "Going Down Slow" (James Oden a.k.a. St. Louis Jimmy) – 4:43

Personnel
 Mike Bloomfield – lead guitar, vocals
 Buddy Miles – drums, vocals
 Barry Goldberg – keyboards
 Harvey Brooks – bass
 Nick Gravenites – vocals, guitar
 Herb Rich – organ, vocals, baritone saxophone, guitar
 Michael Fonfara – keyboards
 Marcus Doubleday – trumpet
 Peter Strazza – tenor saxophone
 Stemsy Hunter – alto saxophone

Additional personnel
Richie Havens –  percussion, sitar
Sivuca –  guitar, percussion
Paul Beaver –  keyboards, Moog synthesizer
Leo Daruczek –  strings
Charles McCracken –  strings
Bobby Notkoff – strings
Julius Held – strings
Roy Segal –  engineer
Jim Marshall – cover photo
Joe Church –  percussion, producer
John Court –  percussion, vocals, producer
Cass Elliot - vocal on "Groovin' Is Easy"

Charts

References

1968 debut albums
The Electric Flag albums
Columbia Records albums